Juliet Glazkova, known by her stage name Saidah Jules, is a Russian actress. She is known for her roles in the Bollywood films Pyaar Impossible!, Jal  and Right Yaaa Wrong.

Personal life 
Jules is from Kaliningrad and grew up in Germany.

Filmography

References

External links 

Living people
People from Kaliningrad
Russian female models
Russian film actresses
Russian expatriates in Germany
Russian expatriates in India
Actresses in Hindi cinema
European actresses in India
Actresses of European descent in Indian films
21st-century Russian actresses
Year of birth missing (living people)